The Daffy Doc is a 1938 Warner Bros. Looney Tunes cartoon supervised by Bob Clampett. The cartoon was released on November 26, 1938, and stars Porky Pig and Daffy Duck.

Plot 
In the operating room of The Stitch in Time Hospital, Dr. Quack, assisted by Dr. Daffy Duck, is about to perform surgery. As the operation starts and Dr. Quack asks for his instruments in an increasing rate, Daffy goes crazy and jumps around the room, tossing the instruments in the air and using the air bag as a punching bag. He is then ejected from the room and ends up stuck in an iron lung. He fights his way out of it, but his body begins to inflate and deflate several times. Humiliated, Daffy insists that he will not take this lying down and states that he will soon get his own patient.

Meanwhile, Dr. Quack finishes the operation and shows the 'patient' is actually a football. The doctor, laughing maniacally, starts to play with it while the audience cheers. Daffy opens the window and sees Porky Pig strolling by the hospital. Seeing his big chance, Daffy follows Porky around the corner and knocks him out with his mallet, then carries him inside on a stretcher. Inside a hospital room, Daffy is examining Porky by checking his heartbeat with a ratty stethoscope and his temperature with a thermometer, which turns out to be a lollipop.

Porky insists that he isn't sick, but Daffy decides to go forth with his plans. After having a consultation with two other images of himself (brought on by a hit on the head with the mallet), he decides to perform surgery on Porky. Grabbing a large saw from his medicine bag, he walks over to Porky and lifts his gown to operate. Porky realizes what Daffy's plan is and squirms around to escape from him. Porky runs out of the room and slams a door behind him in an effort to get away, only to find Daffy standing right behind the door. Porky crashes through the door and the chase goes on. Just as Daffy catches up with Porky they both crash into the iron lung where it spits them back out and they both inflate and deflate like balloons once again.

Home media
This cartoon is included, uncut and in its original black-and-white format, on Looney Tunes Golden Collection: Volume 5, The Essential Daffy Duck and Porky Pig 101 DVDs.

References

External links

Looney Tunes shorts
1938 films
1938 animated films
1938 short films
1930s American animated films
Daffy Duck films
Porky Pig films
Medical-themed films
American black-and-white films
Films scored by Carl Stalling
Films directed by Bob Clampett